Neuroprotectin D1 (NPD1) (10R,17S-dihydroxy-4Z,7Z,11E,13E,15Z,19Z-docosahexaenoic acid) also known as Protectin D1 (PD1) is a docosanoid derived from the polyunsaturated fatty acid (PUFA) docosahexaenoic acid (DHA), which is a component of fish oil and the most important omega-3 PUFA. Like other members of the specialized proresolving mediators class of PUFA metabolites, NPD1 exerts potent anti-inflammatory and anti-apoptotic/neuroprotective bioactivity.  Other neuroprotectins with similar activity include: PDX (10R,17S-dihydroxy-4Z,7Z,11E,13Z,15E,19Z-docosahexaenoic acid); 20-hydroxy-PD1 (10R,17S,20-trihydroxy-4Z,7Z,11E,13E,15Z,19Z-docosahexaenoic acid); and 10-epi-PD1 (10R,17S-Dihydroxy-4Z,7Z,11E,13E,15Z,19Z-docosahexaenoic acid).  The activity of neuroprotectin-like metabolite, 17-epi-PD1 (10R,17R-dihydroxy-4Z,7Z,11E,13E,15Z,19Z-docosahexaenoic acid), has not yet been reported.

Neuroprotectins A and B, which are bicyclohexapeptides, are to be distinguished structurally and mechanistically from the neuroprotectin D's.

See also
Neuroprotection
Docosanoids
Specialized proresolving mediators#Protectins/neuroprotectins

References

Cell biology
Immunology
Metabolic pathways
Fatty acids